Riccardo Gianni Allegretti (born 15 February 1978) is a former Italian footballer and current coach of FC Clivense.

Playing career
He made his Serie A debut on 14 September 2002 against Empoli F.C. He also played over 200 games at Serie B. Allegretti was the captain of Triestina.

In July 2009, he was signed by A.S. Bari along with teammate Filippo Antonelli.

In 2010, he left for Serie B club U.S. Grosseto F.C. On 31 August 2011, Grosseto announced that he was transferred to U.S. Triestina Calcio. The club was newly relegated to 2011–12 Lega Pro Prima Divisione. Triestina bankrupted and folded at the end of season, thus Allegretti became a free agent

On 30 November 2012, Allegretti was signed by another third division club Barletta. He made his debut in the following match day (2 December).

He extended his contract on 12 July 2013.

Coaching career
Following retirement, he took on a coaching career, starting with newly-founded amateur club Città di Cologno, starting in the Terza Categoria league (at the very bottom of the Italian football pyramid), and leading them to promotion to Seconda Categoria in his first season.

He successively took on at amateur Promozione club FC Primorje, winning promotion to Eccellenza in his second season. In the summer of 2019, after obtaining the UEFA A coaching badges, he returned to Monza as a youth coach, first in charge of the Under-17 and then of the Under-19 Primavera squad.

On 6 September 2021, he was unveiled as the new head coach of FC Chievo 2021 (then renamed FC Clivense due to legal reasons), a new club founded by Sergio Pellissier and admitted to Terza Categoria following the exclusion of his and Allegretti's former team A.C. ChievoVerona from Serie B. In the following season, after Clivense's acquisition of Eccellenza club San Martino Speme, which led to the former occupying a slot in the fifth tier of Italian football, Allegretti was confirmed head coach, with Pablo Granoche as his assistant.

References

External links

Italian footballers
Italian football managers
A.C. Milan players
Calcio Lecco 1912 players
Empoli F.C. players
A.C. Reggiana 1919 players
Como 1907 players
Modena F.C. players
A.C. ChievoVerona players
Venezia F.C. players
U.S. Avellino 1912 players
U.S. Triestina Calcio 1918 players
S.S.C. Bari players
F.C. Grosseto S.S.D. players
Serie A players
Serie B players
Association football midfielders
Footballers from Milan
1978 births
Living people